The  Constitutional Court of the Republic of Bashkortostan  was established pursuant to Part 1 of Art. 15 Law of the Republic of Bashkortostan "On the Constitutional Court of the Republic of Bashkortostan" in 1996 as the Constitutional Court in the Republic of Bashkortostan.

The Court consists of a chief justice and eight associate justices who are nominated by the Head and confirmed by the Kurultay.

Many countries do not have separate constitutional courts, but instead delegate constitutional judicial authority to their supreme court. Nonetheless, such courts are sometimes also called "constitutional courts"; for example, some have called the Supreme Court of the United States "the world's oldest constitutional court" because it was the first court in the world to invalidate a law as unconstitutional (Marbury v. Madison), even though it is not a separate constitutional court.
The Court meets in the  Republic House in Ufa.

Notes

External links
 Constitutional Court of the Republic of Bashkortostan

Politics of Bashkortostan
Bashkortostan